Khaneh Hay Saliman (also Romanized as Khāneh Hāy Salīmān) is a village in Kambel-e Soleyman Rural District, in the Central District of Chabahar County, Sistan and Baluchestan Province, Iran. At the 2006 census, its population was 205, with 47 families.

References 

Populated places in Chabahar County